Crash Bandicoot Nitro Kart 3D is a 2008 racing video game developed by Polarbit and published by Vivendi Games Mobile for iOS, N-Gage service, and Zeebo. The game is the fifteenth installment in the Crash Bandicoot video game series, and was released on the App Store in Europe on June 9, 2008 and in North America on July 9, 2008. The game's story centers on a racing tournament held by antagonists Nitrous Oxide, Doctor Neo Cortex and Ripper Roo in an attempt to banish the titular character, Crash Bandicoot, and his friends from their island home. The game was followed by a sequel, Crash Bandicoot Nitro Kart 2, in 2010.

Gameplay
Crash Bandicoot Nitro Kart 3D is a racing game in which the player controls characters from the Crash Bandicoot universe, most of whom race in karts. The game employs tilt-screen controls, allowing the player to steer the kart by tilting the iPhone or iPod Touch in a steering wheel fashion. The karts accelerate automatically. To get around tough turns on a track, the player can initiate a "power slide" by tapping and holding a finger on the screen. The goal in each race is to arrive at finish line in the first place. 

The game features a number of racing modes (including a story mode, a quick race mode and a tournament mode) and a total of 20 tracks to race on. Scattered throughout the tracks are weapons that can be picked up and used against the other racers in a bid to hinder their performance, such as bombs and oil slicks. Special "speed zippers" can be found on the ground that can, if driven over, boost the player's speed for a short time. The same effect can be achieved by picking up a certain power-up off the track and activating it.

Plot
Nitrous Oxide, the main antagonist of Crash Team Racing, teams up with Doctor Neo Cortex and Ripper Roo and stages a kart-racing tournament to bring Crash Bandicoot and his friends out of hiding. The winners of the tournament will be crowned "Kings Of Kart Racing For All Eternity", while the losers will be banished from N. Sanity Island.

Release
Initially, Crash Bandicoot Nitro Kart 3D launched for Symbian on April 29, 2008. The European release was helped by a marketing campaign with contests that had prizes modeled after Australia, and funded wireless application protocol advertising banners across several mobile entertainment sites. Vivendi also organized Crash Bandicoot Grand Prix in certain parts of Europe, where selected fans and key players from the video game industry got a chance to play against each other in kart tournaments. 

The game was later released for N-Gage on January 6, 2009, with exclusive tracks included.

Reception

Often compared to Mario Kart series, the game received positive reviews. Levi Buchanan of IGN commended the game as "the best racer in the App Store right now" noting that there is "lots of tracks to unlock". Hardcore Gamer repeated similar remarks, saying it's "easily the best racing on the iPhone".

Many reviewers praised the game's controls. Levi Buchanan thought they were solid and tight, and Hardcore Gamer noted that they are "responsive and accurate", setting up an example for the potential of iPhone.

By April 2009, Nitro Kart 3D was the highest-selling paid application on the App Store.

References

2008 video games
Activision games
Crash Bandicoot racing games
IOS games
Kart racing video games
N-Gage service games
Symbian games
Video games developed in Sweden
Video games set on fictional islands
Zeebo games